The 2013–14 Czech National Football League was the 21st season of the second tier of the Czech football league, and the first full season since the league was officially renamed from the 2. fotbalová liga to the fotbalová národní liga. The season began on 26 July 2013 and finished on 4 June 2014, with a winter break between November and March.

The title and promotion race for the two promotion places to the 2014–15 1. Liga was contended on the final matchday between Dynamo České Budějovice, Hradec Králové and Táborsko. The former two had been relegated from the 2012–13 Czech First League while the latter would be a newcomer to the top flight. České Budějovice sealed their title with a 6–0 away win against Táborsko, thus ending the only unbeaten home streak in the league, and Hradec Králové won second place by beating local rivals FK Pardubice 1–0. FK Bohemians Prague (Střížkov) and newcomers Loko Vltavín were relegated to the Bohemian Football League after losing both their matches on the 27th matchday.

Team changes

From 2. Liga
In addition to the two lowest-placed clubs being relegated, third-placed HFK Olomouc were also relegated due to financial difficulties.

Promoted to Czech First League
 1. SC Znojmo
 Bohemians 1905

Relegated to Moravian-Silesian Football League
 1. HFK Olomouc
 SFC Opava

Relegated to Bohemian Football League
 FC Zenit Čáslav

To 2. Liga

Relegated from Czech First League
 SK Dynamo České Budějovice
 FC Hradec Králové

Promoted from Bohemian Football League
 Loko Vltavín

Promoted from Moravian-Silesian Football League
 FK Fotbal Třinec
 MFK Frýdek-Místek

Team overview

League table

Results

Top goalscorers

See also
 2013–14 Czech First League
 2013–14 Czech Cup

References

External links

Czech National Football League seasons
Czec
2. Liga